Redditt railway station is located in the community of Redditt in Unorganized Kenora District in Northwestern Ontario, Canada. The station is on the Canadian National Railway transcontinental main line and is in use by Via Rail as a stop for transcontinental Canadian trains.

References

External links
 Redditt railway station

Via Rail stations in Ontario
Railway stations in Kenora District
Canadian National Railway stations in Ontario